Malesija is a toponym that could refer to two places within the former Yugoslavia:

 Malësia, a historical and ethnographic region in northern Albania and eastern central Montenegro 
 Malesia, North Macedonia, a region in North Macedonia

See also 
 Malesia (disambiguation)